The 1949 Michigan State Normal Hurons football team represented Michigan State Normal College (later renamed Eastern Michigan University) during the 1949 college football season. In their first season under head coach Harry Ockerman, the Hurons compiled a 0–8 record and were outscored 180–61 by their opponents. Jack B. VanWagoner and Theodore D. Bott were the team captains.

Ockerman was hired as the school's head football coach in August 1949. He had played football, basketball and baseball at the school from 1924 to 1927. He replaced Elton Rynearson who had been the school's head football coach for more than 25 years. Rynearson continued to serve as the school's athletic director.

Schedule

References

Michigan State Normal
Eastern Michigan Eagles football seasons
Michigan State Normal Hurons football